Mathias Becker (4 February 1907 – 23 January 1952) was a Luxembourgian footballer. He played in twenty-four matches for the Luxembourg national football team between 1927 and 1937.

References

External links
 

1907 births
1952 deaths
Luxembourgian footballers
Luxembourg international footballers
Place of birth missing
Association football midfielders
FA Red Boys Differdange players
Footballers at the 1928 Summer Olympics
Olympic footballers of Luxembourg